The Humbucking Coil is a solo studio album by B. Fleischmann. It was released on Morr Music on 10 February 2006.

Critical reception

At Metacritic, which assigns a weighted average score out of 100 to reviews from mainstream critics, the album received an average score of 74, based on 8 reviews, indicating "generally favorable reviews".

Derek Miller of Stylus Magazine gave the album a grade of B, stating: "With The Humbucking Coil, Fleischmann retreats into more organic territory, flushing out guitar textures and marrowed synth lines with the natural flesh of human drumming given cosmetic whiskering." Split Foster of Tiny Mix Tapes gave the album 3 stars out of 5, writing: "A languid mood piece with discreet variations, Coil is a pleasant, if homogeneous, listening experience."

Track listing

Personnel
Credits adapted from liner notes.

 B. Fleischmann – performance, production, mixing
 Christoph Amann – production, recording, mixing
 Christof Kurzmann – vocals (2, 7), clarinet (6), production, mixing
 Human Empire – artwork

References

External links
 

2006 albums
Morr Music albums
Electronic albums by Austrian artists